Joaquín Luque Roselló (September 27, 1865 - January 23, 1932) was a Spanish painter.

1865 births
1932 deaths
19th-century Spanish painters
19th-century Spanish male artists
Spanish male painters
20th-century Spanish painters
20th-century Spanish male artists